Mt. Gilead State Park is a public recreation area located immediately to the east of the village of Mount Gilead in Morrow County, Ohio, United States. It offers hiking, camping, picnicking, fishing and electric-motor boating as well as wintertime ice skating, ice fishing, and cross-country skiing. Access to the park is via State Route 95.

History
Work on the park began in the early 1900s, with the creation of a dam across Sam's Creek. Work continued through the proceeding decades, with a larger lake being completed below the first one on July 10, 1930. In 1949, the park was turned over to the Ohio Department of Natural Resources.

References

External links
Mt. Gilead State Park Ohio Department of Natural Resources
Mt. Gilead State Park Map Ohio Department of Natural Resources

State parks of Ohio
Protected areas of Morrow County, Ohio
Protected areas established in 1949
1949 establishments in Ohio